The 1917–18 SK Rapid Wien season was the 20th season in club history.

Squad

Squad and statistics

Squad statistics

Fixtures and results

League

References

1917-18 Rapid Wien Season
Rapid